Monodrama Theater, also known as Mono-Drama Theatre, was a late night television series which aired on the DuMont Television Network weekdays at 11pm ET from May 1952 to December 1953.

Production background
The series consisted of a single actor or actress performing in front of a black curtain, or bare stage, with recorded music cues, in an example of monodrama. Some sources suggest this series, produced by Lawrence Menkin (1911-2000), also aired episodes of One Man's Experience and One Woman's Experience, both also produced by Menkin. Filming took place at a tiny studio at 515 Madison Avenue.

In 1953, in a series of episodes of Monodrama Theater, actor Jack Manning performed a one-man show of Hamlet. His performance took place over the course of two weeks in 15-minute-long segments. Jack Gould, a television critic for the New York Times, praised Manning's performance as Hamlet, calling him "inventive, versatile and, above all, natural." Gould also noted of Manning at the time that, "He knows his Shakespeare and truly catches the meaning of the lines."

In April 1954, DuMont filled the 11pm ET time slot with The Ernie Kovacs Show, which ran until April 7, 1955.

Preservation status
As with most DuMont series, no episodes are known to exist.

Episode list
A list of 28 titles from 1953 are given on the Internet Movie Database entry. The list begins with the April 6, 1953, episode, and ends with the final episode of December 7, 1953. Episodes include Hedda Gabler, A Doll's House, Great Expectations, A Tale of Two Cities, and Jane Eyre.

See also
List of programs broadcast by the DuMont Television Network
List of surviving DuMont Television Network broadcasts
1953-54 United States network television schedule
List of late-night American network TV programs

References

Bibliography
David Weinstein, The Forgotten Network: DuMont and the Birth of American Television (Philadelphia: Temple University Press, 2004) 
Alex McNeil, Total Television, Fourth edition (New York: Penguin Books, 1980) 
Tim Brooks and Earle Marsh, The Complete Directory to Prime Time Network TV Shows, Third edition (New York: Ballantine Books, 1964)

External links
Monodrama Theater at IMDB
DuMont historical website

DuMont Television Network original programming
1952 American television series debuts
1953 American television series endings
Black-and-white American television shows
English-language television shows
Lost television shows
Monodrama
1950s American late-night television series